Ballynoe is a village in the barony of Kinnatalloon, County Cork, in Ireland. It gives its name to a civil parish and electoral division. The 2011 census gives its population as 146. St Catherine's is the local Gaelic Athletic Association team.

Notable residents
 Bartholomew MacCarthy was a scholar and chronologist who wrote extensively on Early Irish literature.

References

Towns and villages in County Cork
Civil parishes of County Cork